The Canadian Hockey League is a major junior ice hockey league

Canadian Hockey League or Canada Hockey League or Hockey League of Canada may also refer to:

 Canadian Junior Hockey League, the junior A ice hockey league
 Canadian Amateur Hockey League (1898) early ice hockey league
 Canadian Elite Hockey League (2005) semi-pro ice hockey league
 Canadian–American Hockey League (1926) pro ice hockey league
 Western Canada Hockey League (1923) AAA pro ice hockey league

See also
 CHL (disambiguation)
 Canadian Major Junior Hockey League (disambiguation)
 Canadian Hockey Association (disambiguation)
 Canadian Amateur Hockey Association, predecessor organization to the CHL
 Central Canada Hockey League, junior A ice hockey league